HMS Crusader was a C-class destroyer built for the Royal Navy in the early 1930s. She saw service in the Home and Mediterranean Fleets and spent six months during the Spanish Civil War in late 1936 in Spanish waters, enforcing the arms blockade imposed by Britain and France on both sides of the conflict. Crusader was sold to the Royal Canadian Navy (RCN) in 1938 and renamed HMCS Ottawa. She was initially deployed on the Canadian Pacific Coast before World War II, but was transferred to the Atlantic three months after the war began. Together with a British destroyer, she sank an Italian submarine in the North Atlantic in November 1941.

Design and construction
Steam for the turbines was provided by three Admiralty 3-drum water-tube boilers. The ship's complement was 145 officers and men.

The ship mounted four 45-calibre 4.7-inch Mk IX guns in single mounts, designated 'A', 'B', 'X', and 'Y' from front to rear. For anti-aircraft (AA) defence, Crusader had a single QF 3-inch 20 cwt AA gun between her funnels, and two  QF 2-pounder Mk II AA guns mounted on the aft end of her forecastle deck. The  AA gun was removed in 1936 and the 2-pounders were relocated to between the funnels. She was fitted with two above-water quadruple torpedo tube mounts for 21-inch torpedoes. Three depth-charge chutes were fitted, each with a capacity of two depth charges. After World War II began this was increased to 33 depth charges, delivered by one or two rails and two throwers.

The ship was ordered on 15 July 1930 from Portsmouth Dockyard under the 1929 Naval Programme. Crusader was laid down on 12 September 1930, launched on 30 September 1931, as the second ship to carry the name, and completed on 2 May 1932.

Service history
Crusader was initially assigned to the 2nd Destroyer Flotilla of Home Fleet and remained with this flotilla for the next four years. She received her first refit at Portsmouth from 30 July to 4 September 1934. Following the Italian invasion of Abyssinia in August 1935, Crusader was sent with the rest of her flotilla to reinforce the Mediterranean Fleet the following month. From October to March 1936 she was deployed in the Red Sea to monitor Italian warship movements. Upon her return in April, the ship was refitted at Portsmouth from 27 April to 30 May. During the beginning of the Spanish Civil War in August–September 1936, the ship evacuated British nationals from Spanish ports on the Bay of Biscay. Crusader was assigned as the plane guard for the aircraft carrier  from January 1937 to March 1938, aside from a brief refit between 30 March and 27 April 1937. The ship began a major refit at Sheerness on 28 April 1938 to bring her up to Canadian specifications that included the installation of Type 124 ASDIC.

Transfer to the Royal Canadian Navy
The ship was purchased by the Royal Canadian Navy and she was commissioned on 15 June as HMCS Ottawa. The ship was assigned to the Canadian Pacific Coast and arrived at Esquimalt on 7 November 1938. She remained there until she was ordered to Halifax, Nova Scotia on 15 November 1939 where she escorted local convoys, including the convoy carrying half of the 1st Canadian Infantry Division to the UK on 10 December. Ottawas stern was damaged in a collision with the tugboat Bansurf in April 1940, and repairs took two months to complete.

On 27 August 1940, Ottawa was sailed to Greenock, Scotland, and assigned to the 10th Escort Group of the Western Approaches Command upon her arrival on 4 September for convoy escort duties. In October, the ship's rear torpedo tube mount was exchanged for a 12-pounder AA gun. By mid-November, Ottawa had been fitted with a Type 286M short-range surface-search radar, adapted from the Royal Air Force's ASV radar. This early model, however, could only scan directly forward and had to be aimed by turning the entire ship.

Ottawa returned to Canada in June 1941 and was assigned to the RCN's Newfoundland Escort Force which covered convoys in the Mid-Atlantic. She was transferred to Escort Group C4 in May 1942. In early September, the ship's captain refused to allow her director-control tower and rangefinder to be removed in exchange for a Type 271 target indication radar. Ten minutes later, unable to manoeuvre, she was hit by a second torpedo. She sank ten minutes later; 114 crewmen lost their lives, including the commanding officer, while nearby vessels rescued 69 survivors.

The armament changes undergone by the ship during the war are not entirely clear. Photographic evidence shows that four Oerlikon 20 mm AA guns were added, one pair to her searchlight platform and the other pair on the bridge wings, although Ottawa retained her 2-pounder guns even after the Oerlikons were added. The 'Y' gun was also removed to allow her depth charge stowage to be increased to at least 60 depth charges.

Trans-Atlantic convoys escorted

Notes

Footnotes

References

External links
 Ottawa on Naval-history.net

 

Ships of the Royal Canadian Navy
1931 ships
Canadian River-class destroyers
Canadian River-class destroyers converted from C and D-class destroyers
Ships built in Portsmouth
Ships sunk by German submarines in World War II
Shipwrecks of the Newfoundland and Labrador coast
World War II shipwrecks in the Atlantic Ocean
Maritime incidents in September 1942